Mbewe is a surname  of Zambian origin. Notable people with the surname include:
 Agripa Mbewe (born 1987), retired Zambian football striker
 Ernest Mbewe (born 1994), Zambian footballer 
 Festus Mbewe (born 1988), Zambian footballer
 Mary Mbewe, Zambian journalist
 Tsakane Mbewe (born 1987), South African netball player

Zambian surnames